Bartonia virginica is species of flowering plant in Gentianaceae. It is the commonly called yellow screwstem or yellow bartonia and it is an annual species with small pale green to yellow flowers.

Description
Bartonia virginica is an annual plant, that typically has simple stems that are wiry and erect. The stems are 1–4 dm tall, with opposite, strongly ascending branches.  The leaves are scale-like usually opposite.  The flowers are arranging in racemose or paniculate inflorescence, which have commonly opposite, very upright branches and pedicels. Each flower is 3–4 mm long with lance-subulate shaped sepals. The petals are oblong in shape and usually have denticulate margins and are abruptly narrowed to a rounded or obtuse, often mucronate tip. The anthers are minutely apiculate. It flowers late summer. The diploid (2n) chromosome count is fifty-two.

Habitat
Bartonia virginica grows in sphagnum bogs and wet meadows, where it is found in acids bogs with sphagnum or Polytrichum mosses.

Distribution
The native distribution of Bartonia virginica is eastern North America and is centered around the Atlantic coastal plain, with scattered inland populations.  It has been found in Quebec and Nova Scotia of Canada to the US states of Wisconsin south to Florida and Louisiana.
It reaches the most western part of its range in eastern Minnesota, where it is very rare and listed as endangered, having been recorded in Goodhue and Anoka counties in white cedar swamps and peat bogs.

References 

Gentianaceae
Plants described in 1888